Down Laredo Way is a 1953 American Western film directed by William Witney and starring Rex Allen, Dona Drake and Slim Pickens.

The film's art direction was by Frank Arrigo.

Plot

Cast
 Rex Allen as Rex Allen  
 Koko as Koko, Rex's Horse  
 Slim Pickens as Slim  
 Dona Drake as Narita  
 Marjorie Lord as Valerie 
 Roy Barcroft as Cooper  
 Judy Nugent as Taffy Wells 
 Percy Helton as Judge Sully  
 Clayton Moore as Chip Wells  
 Zon Murray as Joe, the Fake Deputy 
 Kay Riehl as Doll Woman

References

Bibliography
 Pitts, Michael R. Western Movies: A Guide to 5,105 Feature Films. McFarland, 2012.

External links
 

1953 films
1953 Western (genre) films
American Western (genre) films
Films directed by William Witney
Republic Pictures films
American black-and-white films
1950s English-language films
1950s American films